The 1998 Auburn Tigers football team represented Auburn University in the 1998 NCAA Division I-A football season.
After using six different centers on the offensive line due to injury, Auburn finished the season with a 3–8 record. The Tigers began the season coached by Terry Bowden, who led the team to a 1–5 start. Criticism of the coaching arose among fans and key supporters, which resulted in Bowden's resignation on October 23, the day before the Tigers played Louisiana Tech. Defensive coordinator Bill Oliver became the interim head coach for the remainder of the season. Auburn played Alabama on November 21 for the last time at Legion Field in Birmingham. Since then, the Iron Bowl has generally been hosted on an alternating basis at the respective on-campus stadium.

Schedule

Rankings

References

Auburn
Auburn Tigers football seasons
Auburn Tigers football